Gordon Blair may refer to:

 Gordon Blair (musician) (born 1953), Northern Irish musician
 Gordon Blair (politician) (1919–2006), Canadian lawyer, politician and judge
Gordon Blair (computing), British computer scientist